Charles Dale is the name of:

Charles Dale (comedian) (1881–1971), American vaudeville comedian
Charles Dale (born 1963), Welsh actor
Charles M. Dale (1893–1978), governor of New Hampshire, U.S.A.
Charles Dale (musician) from Johnny Hamp's Kentucky Serenaders

See also
Charles Dail, American Democratic politician